Jette Sandahl (born 1949) is a Danish curator, museum director and business executive. Founding director of the Women’s Museum of Denmark and the Museum of World Culture in Gothenburg, Sweden, she has more recently served as director of the Museum of Copenhagen. She is currently a member of the European Museum Forum's board of trustees.

References

1949 births
Living people
People from the North Jutland Region
Directors of museums in Denmark
Women museum directors
Directors of museums in Sweden
Danish curators
Danish women curators